B-cell may refer to :

 B cells, lymphocytes that mature in bone
 Beta cells (β cells), in the pancreatic islets that produce insulin